Graham Harold Galbraith  (born 16 October 1960) is a British academic and administrator who has served as Vice-Chancellor of the University of Portsmouth since September 2013. He previously served as Deputy Vice-Chancellor of the University of Hertfordshire and Pro Vice-Chancellor (International) of the Glasgow Caledonian University.

Galbraith holds Chartered Engineer status, Fellowship of the Higher Education Academy, Membership of the Chartered Institution for Building Service Engineers and is a Member of the Institute of Directors. In the 2022 New Year Honours List, Galbraith was awarded a CBE for services to Higher education.

Education 
  
Galbraith attended the University of Strathclyde, where he gained a Bachelor of Science in Environmental Energy, followed by a Master of Science and PhD in Mechanical Engineering.

References 

Academics of the University of Portsmouth
British academics
1960 births
People associated with the University of Portsmouth
Living people